More Greatest Hits may refer to:

 More Greatest Hits (Connie Francis album)
 More Greatest Hits of The Monkees